Tavi Murray,  is a glaciologist, the eighth woman to be awarded the Polar Medal.

Education
After school in Twickenham Murray gained a BSc degree with first class honours in Physics and Computer Science from the University of Wales, Aberystwyth. In 1990 she was awarded a PhD in geophysics from  the University of Cambridge's Scott Polar Research Institute.

Academic career
In 1993 Murray was appointed Lecturer in Physical Geography at the University of Leeds, being promoted to Reader in Glaciology in 2002 and Professor of Glaciology at Leeds in 2004. In 2005 she was appointed Professor of Glaciology at Swansea University where she heads up the Swansea Glaciological Group.

Honours and awards
From 2004 she has been Leverhulme Research Fellow studying "Basal conditions on Rutford Ice Stream, Antarctica". A leading member of the International Glaciological Society Murray is unusual that her medal cited discoveries at both poles. September 2007 marked the launch of the GLIMPSE Project, a 5-year project headed by Murray to determine the controls on thinning at the margin of the Greenland Ice Sheet. GLIMPSE is funded by a Leverhulme Trust Research Leadership Award granted to Murray in mid-2007.

Murray was appointed Commander of the Order of the British Empire (CBE) in the 2022 New Year Honours for services to glaciology and climate change research.

Other interests 
Tavi is an accomplished sea kayaker: she was part of a team of 3 people that attempted to sail anti-clockwise around Ireland.

Bibliography
An up to date list of Murray's publications is available. 
Atkinson, P., Jiskoot, H., Massari, R. and Murray, T. Generalised Linear Modelling applications in geomorphology. Earth Surface Processes and Landforms Technical and Software Bulletin, 23, 1185–1195, 1998. 
Barrand, N.E. and Murray, T. (In review) Multivariate controls on the incidence of glacier surging in the Karakoram Himalaya. Arctic, Antarctic and Alpine Research, submitted October 2005.
Fowler, A. C., Murray, T. and Ng, F.S.L. Thermal regulation of glacier surging. Journal of Glaciology, 47(159), 527–538, 2001.
Jiskoot, H., Pedersen, A.K. and Murray, T. Multi-model photogrammetric analysis of the 1990s surge of Sortebræ, East Greenland. Journal of Glaciology, 47(159), 677–687, 2001. 
Lockwood, R.A., Murray, T., Stuart, G.W. and Scudder, L. Locating leaks from water supply pipes using the passive acoustic method, Journal of Water Supply: Research and Technology, 54(8), 519–530, 2005. 
Luckman, A., Murray, T. and Strozzi, T. Surface flow evolution throughout a glacier surge measured by satellite radar interferometry, Geophysical Research Letters, 29(23), 2095, 10.1029/2001GL014570, 2002.
Murray, T. Assessing the paradigm shift: deformable glacier beds. Quaternary Science Reviews, 16(9): 995–1016, 1997. 
Pritchard, H., Murray, T., Strozzi, T., Barr, S. and Luckman, A. Glacier surge-related topographic change derived from Synthetic Aperture Radar interferometry, Journal of Glaciology, 49(166), 381–390, 2003.
James, T.D., Murray, T., Barrand, N.E. and Barr, S.L., Extracting photogrammetric ground control from lidar DEMs for change detection, Photogrammetric Record. 21(116): 310–326, 2006.
Kohler, J., James, T.D., Murray, T., Nuth, C., Brandt, O., Barrand, N.E., Aas, H.F. and Luckman, A.J. (2007). Acceleration in thinning rate on western Svalbard glaciers, Geophysical Research Letters, 34(L18502): .

See also
GLIMPSE Project

References

People from Oxford
Alumni of the University of Cambridge
Alumni of Aberystwyth University
British glaciologists
Women glaciologists
Academics of the University of Leeds
Explorers of Antarctica
Explorers of the Arctic
Female polar explorers
Recipients of the Polar Medal
Female recipients of the Polar Medal
Academics of Swansea University
Living people
British women geologists
British geologists
Women Antarctic scientists
Year of birth missing (living people)
Commanders of the Order of the British Empire
British Antarctic scientists